A light-year is the distance that light travels through a vacuum in one year.

Light year(s) and lightyear(s) may also refer to:

Film and television
 Buzz Lightyear, a main character in the animated film series Toy Story
 Lightyear (film), a spinoff animated film featuring the character
 Gandahar (film), a 1988 animated science fiction film known as Light Years in English
 Light Years (2015 film), a British drama film  
 Light Years, an American TV series that has been renamed Life Unexpected
 Light Years, a Singaporean drama produced by Mediacorp Channel 5

Music
 Lightyear (band), ska-punk band from the United Kingdom
 Light Years (band), pop-punk band from Cleveland, Ohio
 The Lightyears, pop-rock band based in London, England

Albums
 Light Years (Chick Corea album), 1987
 Light Years, The Very Best of Electric Light Orchestra, 1997 compilation album by Electric Light Orchestra
 Light Years (Glen Campbell album), 1988
 Light Years (Kylie Minogue album), 2000
 Light Year, a 2021 album by Emma Stevens
 Light Years, a 2005 album by Kathy Valentine
 Light Years, a 2012 album by Kora
 Light Years, a 2014 album by Noah23 and David Klopek
 Light Years, a 2008 album by The Shore
 Lightyears, a 2014 album by David Ryan Harris
 Lightyears, a 2012 EP by Mansions on the Moon
 Lightyears, a 2007 album by Shin Terai, Bill Laswell and Buckethead
 Lightyears, a 2001 album by Sunbeam
 A series of 1995 compilation albums by Christian artists, including:
 The Light Years by Allies
 The Light Years by Andraé Crouch
 The Light Years by Bryan Duncan
 The Light Years by Resurrection Band
 The Light Years by Sweet Comfort Band
 The Light Years by Walter Hawkins

Songs
 "Light Years" (Jamiroquai song), 1994
 "Light Years" (Pearl Jam song), 2000
 "Light Years", 1994 song by Heather Nova from Oyster
 "Lightyears", 1996 song by Eraserheads from Fruitcake (album)
 "Lightyear", 1997 song by Mentallo & The Fixer from Burnt Beyond Recognition
 "Light Years", 2019 song by The National from I Am Easy to Find
 "Light Year", 2018 song by The Story So Far from Proper Dose

Other uses
 Lightyear Entertainment, a movie and music distributor
 Light Years (book), a 1975 novel by James Salter
 Light Years: An Investigation into the Extraterrestrial Experiences of Eduard Meier (1987), a non-fiction book by Gary Kinder
 Lightyear 0, a Dutch electric car

See also

 
 
 Parsec (disambiguation)
 Light (disambiguation)
 LY (disambiguation)
 Year